Sant Ramon is a municipality in the county of Segarra, in Catalonia. It includes the villages of Gospí, Portell and Viver de Segarra. The name references Saint Raymond Nonnatus because he was born in Portell.

Demographics

References

External links
 Government data pages 

Municipalities in Segarra